"Animal" is a song by British singer Conor Maynard from his debut studio album, Contrast. It was released as the album's fourth single as a digital download on 20 January 2013, featuring vocals from English rapper, MC, songwriter, record producer and recording artist Wiley (also known as "The Godfather of Grime"). The song was written by Conor Maynard, The Invisible Men, Sophie Stern, Kurtis McKenzie, Joey Dyer, Jon Mills and produced by The Invisible Men, The Arcade. The song entered the UK Singles Chart at number 34 on 20 January 2013, climbing twenty-eight places the following week to number 6, becoming Maynard's third highest-charting single.

Music video
A music video to accompany the release of "Animal" was first released onto YouTube on 11 December 2012 at a total length of three minutes and twenty-eight seconds.

Critical reception
Lewis Corner of Digital Spy gave the song a positive review, praising its "militant beats and wall-bouncing synths", and saying:
Despite his sex-charged pleas to "mess me up" being at odds with his boyish charm, 12 months on we're still standing by our judgement that Conor is one of pop's most exciting new stars. .

Track listing

Credits and personnel
 Lead vocals – Conor Maynard, Wiley
 Producers – The Invisible Men, The Arcade
 Lyrics – Conor Maynard, The Invisible Men, Sophie Stern, Kurtis McKenzie, Joey Dyer, Jon Mills
 Label: Parlophone

Chart performance

Weekly charts

Year-end charts

Release history

References

External links
 Conor Maynard interview by Pete Lewis, 'Blues & Soul' January 2013

2012 songs
2013 singles
Conor Maynard songs
Wiley (musician) songs
Songs written by Jason Pebworth
Songs written by George Astasio
Songs written by Jon Shave
Songs written by Kurtis Mckenzie
Song recordings produced by the Invisible Men
Parlophone singles